Leószilárdite is a mineral discovered by Travis Olds of the University of Notre Dame and colleagues in the Markey Mine in Utah, USA. They named the mineral in honor of Leó Szilárd, Hungarian-born physicist and inventor. Leószilárdite is the first naturally occurring sodium- and magnesium-containing uranyl carbonate. It is rare and water-soluble, and was discovered on a seam of carbon-rich material deposited by an ancient stream. Groundwater reacted with the uraninite ore to create leószilárdite and other minerals.

Localities 
USA: Markey Mine, Red Canyon, White Canyon District, San Juan County, Utah

References 

Uranyl compounds
Carbonate minerals